A negative base (or negative radix) may be used to construct a non-standard positional numeral system.

Negative-base systems can accommodate all the same numbers as standard place-value systems, but both positive and negative numbers are represented without the use of a minus sign (or, in computer representation, a sign bit); this advantage is countered by an increased complexity of arithmetic operations. The need to store the information normally contained by a negative sign often results in a negative-base number being one digit longer than its positive-base equivalent.

The common names for negative-base positional numeral systems are formed by prefixing nega- to the name of the corresponding positive-base system; for example, negadecimal (base −10) corresponds to decimal (base 10), negabinary (base −2) to binary (base 2), negaternary (base −3) to ternary (base 3), and negaquaternary (base −4) to quaternary (base 4).

Example
Consider what is meant by the representation  in the negadecimal system, whose base  is −10:

Remark
On the other hand,  in decimal would be written  in negadecimal.

History
Negative numerical bases were first considered by Vittorio Grünwald in an 1885 monograph published in Giornale di Matematiche di Battaglini. Grünwald gave algorithms for performing addition, subtraction, multiplication, division, root extraction, divisibility tests, and radix conversion.  Negative bases were later mentioned in passing by A. J. Kempner in 1936 and studied in more detail by Zdzisław Pawlak and A. Wakulicz in 1957.

Negabinary was implemented in the early Polish computer BINEG (and UMC), built 1957–59, based on ideas by Z. Pawlak and A. Lazarkiewicz from the Mathematical Institute in Warsaw.  Implementations since then have been rare.

Notation and use

Negative-base systems may thus be compared to signed-digit representations, such as balanced ternary, where the radix is positive but the digits are taken from a partially negative range. (In the table below the digit of value −1 is written as the single character T.)

Some numbers have the same representation in base  as in base .  For example, the numbers from 100 to 109 have the same representations in decimal and negadecimal.  Similarly,

and is represented by 10001 in binary and 10001 in negabinary.

Some numbers with their expansions in a number of positive and corresponding negative bases are:

Note that, with the exception of nega balanced ternary, the base  expansions of negative integers have an even number of digits, while the base  expansions of the non-negative integers have an odd number of digits.

Calculation
To arrive at the correct conversion, the value for  must be chosen such that  is non-negative and minimal. For the fourth line of the following example this means that

has to be chosen — and not  nor 

For example, to convert 146 in decimal to negaternary:

Reading the remainders backward we obtain the negaternary representation of 14610: 21102–3.
Proof: (((2 · (–3) + 1) · (–3) + 1) · (–3) + 0) · (–3) + 2 = 14610.

Note that in most programming languages, the result (in integer arithmetic) of dividing a negative number by a negative number is rounded towards 0, usually leaving a negative remainder. In such a case we have . Because ,  is the positive remainder.

Example implementation code

To negabinary

C# 
static string ToNegabinary(int value)
{
	string result = string.Empty;

	while (value != 0)
	{
		int remainder = value % -2;
		value = value / -2;

		if (remainder < 0)
		{
			remainder += 2;
			value += 1;
		}

		result = remainder.ToString() + result;
	}

	return result;
}

C++ 
auto to_negabinary(int value)
{
    std::bitset<sizeof(int) * CHAR_BIT > result;
    std::size_t bit_position = 0;

    while (value != 0)
    {
        const auto div_result = std::div(value, -2);

        if (div_result.rem < 0)
            value = div_result.quot + 1;
        else
            value = div_result.quot;

        result.set(bit_position, div_result.rem != 0);

        ++bit_position;
    }

    return result;
}

To negaternary

C# 
static string negaternary(int value)
{
	string result = string.Empty;

	while (value != 0)
	{
		int remainder = value % -3;
		value = value / -3;

		if (remainder < 0)
		{
			remainder += 3;
			value += 1;
		}

		result = remainder.ToString() + result;
	}

	return result;
}

Visual Basic .NET 
Private Shared Function ToNegaternary(value As Integer) As String
	Dim result As String = String.Empty

	While value <> 0
		Dim remainder As Integer = value Mod -3
		value /= -3

		If remainder < 0 Then
			remainder += 3
			value += 1
		End If

		result = remainder.ToString() & result
	End While

	Return result
End Function

Python 
def negaternary(i: int) -> str:
    """Decimal to negaternary."""
    if i == 0:
        digits = ["0"]
    else:
        digits = []
        while i != 0:
            i, remainder = divmod(i, -3)
            if remainder < 0:
                i, remainder = i + 1, remainder + 3
            digits.append(str(remainder))
    return "".join(digits[::-1])
>>> negaternary(1000)
'2212001'

Common Lisp 
(defun negaternary (i)
  (if (zerop i)
      "0"
      (let ((digits "")
            (rem 0))
        (loop while (not (zerop i)) do
          (progn
            (multiple-value-setq (i rem) (truncate i -3))
            (when (minusp rem)
              (incf i)
              (incf rem 3))
            (setf digits (concatenate 'string (write-to-string rem) digits))))
        digits)))

To any negative base

Java 
public String negativeBase(int integer, int base) {
    String result = "";
    int number = integer;
    while (number != 0) {
        int i = number % base;
        number /= base;
        if (i < 0) {
            i += Math.abs(base);
            number++;
        }
        result = i + result;
    }
    return result;
}

AutoLisp 
from [-10 -2] interval:
(defun negabase (num baz / dig rst)
  ;; NUM is any number. BAZ is any number in the interval [-10, -2].
  ;;
  ;; NUM and BAZ will be truncated to an integer if they're floats (e.g. 14.25
  ;; will be truncated to 14, -123456789.87 to -123456789, etc.).
  (if (and (numberp num)
           (numberp baz)
           (<= (fix baz) -2)
           (> (fix baz) -11))
      (progn
        (setq baz (float (fix baz))
              num (float (fix num))
              dig (if (= num 0) "0" ""))
        (while (/= num 0)
               (setq rst (- num (* baz (setq num (fix (/ num baz))))))
               (if (minusp rst)
                   (setq num (1+ num)
                         rst (- rst baz)))
               (setq dig (strcat (itoa (fix rst)) dig)))
        dig)
      (progn
        (prompt
         (cond
           ((and (not (numberp num))
                 (not (numberp baz)))
            "\nWrong number and negabase.")
           ((not (numberp num))
            "\nWrong number.")
           ((not (numberp baz))
            "\nWrong negabase.")
           (t
            "\nNegabase must be inside [-10 -2] interval.")))
        (princ))))

PHP 
The conversion from integer to some negative base:
function toNegativeBase($no, $base)
{
    $digits = array();
    $base = intval($base);
    while ($no != 0) {
        $temp_no = $no;
        $no = intval($temp_no / $base);
        $remainder = ($temp_no % $base);

        if ($remainder < 0) {
            $remainder += abs($base);
            $no++;
        }

        array_unshift($digits, $remainder);
    }

    return $digits;
}

Visual Basic .NET 
Function toNegativeBase(Number As Integer , base As Integer) As System.Collections.Generic.List(Of Integer)

    Dim digits As New System.Collections.Generic.List(Of Integer)
    while Number <> 0
        Dim remainder As Integer= Number Mod base
        Number = CInt(Number / base)
 
        if remainder < 0 then
            remainder += system.math.abs(base)
            Number+=1
        end if
 
        digits.Insert(0, remainder)
    end while
 
    return digits
end function

Shortcut calculation 
The following algorithms assume that
 the input is available in bitstrings and coded in (base +2; digits in ) (as in most of today's digital computers),
 there are add (+) and xor (^) operations which operate on such bitstrings (as in most of today's digital computers),
 the set  of output digits is standard, i. e.  with base ,
 the output is coded in the same bitstring format, but the meaning of the places is another one.

To negabinary
The conversion to negabinary (base −2; digits in ) allows a remarkable shortcut 
(C implementation):
unsigned int toNegaBinary(unsigned int value) // input in standard binary
{
	unsigned int Schroeppel2 = 0xAAAAAAAA; // = 2/3*((2*2)^16-1) = ...1010
	return (value + Schroeppel2) ^ Schroeppel2; // eXclusive OR
	// resulting unsigned int to be interpreted as string of elements ε {0,1} (bits)
}

Due to D. Librik (Szudzik). The bitwise XOR portion is originally due to Schroeppel (1972).

JavaScript port for the same shortcut calculation: 
function toNegaBinary(number) {
    var Schroeppel2 = 0xAAAAAAAA;
    // Convert to NegaBinary String
    return ( ( number + Schroeppel2 ) ^ Schroeppel2 ).toString(2);
}

To negaquaternary
The conversion to negaquaternary (base −4; digits in ) allows a similar shortcut (C implementation):
unsigned int toNegaQuaternary(unsigned int value) // input in standard binary
{
	unsigned int Schroeppel4 = 0xCCCCCCCC; // = 4/5*((2*4)^8-1) = ...11001100 = ...3030
	return (value + Schroeppel4) ^ Schroeppel4; // eXclusive OR
	// resulting unsigned int to be interpreted as string of elements ε {0,1,2,3} (pairs of bits)
}

JavaScript port for the same shortcut calculation: 
function toNegaQuaternary(number) {
    var Schroeppel4 = 0xCCCCCCCC;
    // Convert to NegaQuaternary String
    return ( ( number + Schroeppel4 ) ^ Schroeppel4 ).toString(4);
}

Arithmetic operations
The following describes the arithmetic operations for negabinary; calculations in larger bases are similar.

Addition
Adding negabinary numbers proceeds bitwise, starting from the least significant bits; the bits from each addend are summed with the (balanced ternary) carry from the previous bit (0 at the LSB). This sum is then decomposed into an output bit and carry for the next iteration as show in the table:

The second row of this table, for instance, expresses the fact that −1 = 1 + 1 × −2; the fifth row says 2 = 0 + −1 × −2; etc.

As an example, to add 1010101 (1 + 4 + 16 + 64 = 85) and 1110100 (4 + 16 − 32 + 64 = 52),

 Carry:          1 −1  0 −1  1 −1  0  0  0
 First addend:         1  0  1  0  1  0  1
 Second addend:        1  1  1  0  1  0  0 +
                --------------------------
 Number:         1 −1  2  0  3 −1  2  0  1
 Bit (result):   1  1  0  0  1  1  0  0  1
 Carry:          0  1 −1  0 −1  1 −1  0  0

so the result is 110011001 (1 − 8 + 16 − 128 + 256 = 137).

Another method 
While adding two negabinary numbers, every time a carry is generated an extra carry should be propagated to next bit. Consider same example as above

 Extra carry:       1  1  0  1  0  0  0     
 Carry:          1  0  1  1  0  1  0  0  0
 First addend:         1  0  1  0  1  0  1
 Second addend:        1  1  1  0  1  0  0 +
                --------------------------
 Answer:         1  1  0  0  1  1  0  0  1

Negabinary full adder 
A full adder circuit can be designed to add numbers in negabinary. The following logic is used to calculate the sum and carries:

Incrementing negabinary numbers 
Incrementing a negabinary number can be done by using the following formula:

Subtraction
To subtract, multiply each bit of the second number by −1, and add the numbers, using the same table as above.

As an example, to compute 1101001 (1 − 8 − 32 + 64 = 25) minus 1110100 (4 + 16 − 32 + 64 = 52),

 Carry:          0  1 −1  1  0  0  0
 First number:   1  1  0  1  0  0  1
 Second number: −1 −1 −1  0 −1  0  0 +
                --------------------
 Number:         0  1 −2  2 −1  0  1
 Bit (result):   0  1  0  0  1  0  1
 Carry:          0  0  1 −1  1  0  0

so the result is 100101 (1 + 4 −32 = −27).

Unary negation, can be computed as binary subtraction from zero, .

Multiplication and division
Shifting to the left multiplies by −2, shifting to the right divides by −2.

To multiply, multiply like normal decimal or binary numbers, but using the negabinary rules for adding the carry, when adding the numbers.

 First number:                   1  1  1  0  1  1  0
 Second number:                  1  0  1  1  0  1  1 ×
               -------------------------------------
                                 1  1  1  0  1  1  0
                              1  1  1  0  1  1  0
 
                        1  1  1  0  1  1  0
                     1  1  1  0  1  1  0
 
               1  1  1  0  1  1  0                   +
               -------------------------------------
 Carry:        0 −1  0 −1 −1 −1 −1 −1  0 −1  0  0
 Number:       1  0  2  1  2  2  2  3  2  0  2  1  0
 Bit (result): 1  0  0  1  0  0  0  1  0  0  0  1  0
 Carry:           0 −1  0 −1 −1 −1 −1 −1  0 −1  0  0

For each column, add carry to number, and divide the sum by −2, to get the new carry, and the resulting bit as the remainder.

Comparing negabinary numbers
It is possible to compare negabinary numbers by slightly adjusting a normal unsigned binary comparator.
After this, compare  and  using a standard unsigned comparator.

Fractional numbers
Base  representation may of course be carried beyond the radix point, allowing the representation of non-integer numbers.

As with positive-base systems, terminating representations correspond to fractions where the denominator is a power of the base; repeating representations correspond to other rationals, and for the same reason.

Non-unique representations
Unlike positive-base systems, where integers and terminating fractions have non-unique representations (for example, in decimal 0.999... = 1) in negative-base systems the integers have only a single representation.  However, there do exist rationals with non-unique representations. For the digits {0, 1, ..., t} with  the biggest digit and

we have
     as well as

So every number  with a terminating fraction  added has two distinct representations.

 .

Such non-unique representations can be found by considering the largest and smallest possible representations with integer parts 0 and 1 respectively, and then noting that they are equal. (Indeed, this works with any integer-base system.) The rationals thus non-uniquely expressible are those of form
 
with

Imaginary base 

Just as using a negative base allows the representation of negative numbers without an explicit negative sign, using an imaginary base allows the representation of Gaussian integers. Donald Knuth proposed the quater-imaginary base (base 2i) in 1955.

See also 
 Quater-imaginary base
 Binary
 Balanced ternary
 Quaternary numeral system
 Numeral systems
 1 − 2 + 4 − 8 + ⋯ (p-adic numbers)

References

Further reading

External links

Non-standard positional numeral systems
Computer arithmetic